Erickson Corner (also Erickson Corners) is an unincorporated community in the town of New Milford, Litchfield County, Connecticut, United States.

Notes

Villages in Litchfield County, Connecticut
Villages in Connecticut